Entre el Amor y el Odio (English: Between Love and Hatred) is a Mexican telenovela produced by Salvador Mejía Alejandre for Televisa in 2002. It is based on the radionovela Cadena de odio by Hilda Morales de Allouis. It aired on Canal de las Estrellas from Monday, February 11, 2002 to Friday, August 2, 2002.

The series stars Susana González, César Évora, Sabine Moussier, Alberto Estrella, María Sorté, Carmen Salinas and Marga López.

Plot
After a long absence, Octavio Villarreal (César Évora) returns to Guanajuato in order to see his uncle Fernando (Joaquín Cordero), who is on his deathbed.

Octavio always considered his uncle to be like a father until Fernando prevented him from marrying Frida (Sabine Moussier). Since that day Octavio has only felt resentment towards Fernando. Octavio heads for the Villarreal mansion in his car with Marcial (Alberto Estrella), a trusted employee of Fernando, when they are intercepted by a girl on a horse.

Octavio is taken with the young woman's beauty, but the contemptuous Marcial tells him that Ana Cristina (Susana González) is Fernando's lover. This is a lie, however; Fernando has only protected the girl who lives on the Villarreal grounds with her supposed grandfather, Manuel (Miguel Corcega).

Fernando dies in Ana Cristina's arms, confessing to her that the love of his life was a woman named Leonela. Upon seeing his uncle's body, Octavio remembers the love they had and takes out his pain and frustration on Ana Cristina, calling her a whore.

However, Fernando's will stipulates that his nephew and his protégée will inherit his shoe factory, but only if they marry and live together for a year. The corrupt Marcial goes to Miami to find the ambitious Frida, who renews her relationship with Octavio even though he has married Ana Cristina.

Marcial and Frida want to take over the factory and conspire so that this marriage does not last any longer than necessary, sowing doubts in Octavio's heart about the purity and good intentions of his wife. Although Octavio loves Ana Cristina, his doubts lead him to abandon her and go to Miami with Frida.

From there he returns in the company of the businessman Rogelio Valencia, a man who has a lot to do with the now-pregnant Ana Cristina's past. Frida, also, is pregnant, and Octavio finds himself trapped between his love for his wife and his obligation to the child that Frida carries.

Cast
 
Susana González as Ana Cristina Robles
César Évora as Octavio Villarreal
Sabine Moussier as Frida Díaz de Villareal "Dama de la Corte"
Alberto Estrella as Marcial Andrade "Napoleón"
María Sorté as María Magdalena Ortiz
Carmen Salinas as Consuelo "Chelo"
Marga López as Doña Josefa Villareal
Joaquín Cordero as Don Fernando Villarreal
Fabián Robles as José Alfredo Moreno Ortiz
Luis Roberto Guzmán as Gabriel Moreno Ortiz
Vanessa Guzmán as Juliana Valencia Montes
Luz Elena González as Fuensanta de Moreno
Maritza Olivares as Cayetana
Silvia Manríquez as Rosalía
Enrique Lizalde as Rogelio Valencia
Felicia Mercado as Lucila Montes
Elizabeth Aguilar as Mirna Nogales de Amaral
Ninón Sevilla as Macarena Nogales
Ofelia Cano as Rebeca Ortiz
Eduardo Noriega as Moisés Moyano
Juan Carlos Serrán as Vicente "Chente" Amaral
Carlos Amador as Chito
Marlene Favela as Cecilia Amaral
José Luis Reséndez as Nazario Amaral
Radamés de Jesús as Marcelino
Rubén Morales as Father Jesús Alarcón
Juan Ignacio Aranda as Facundo
Alberto Loztin as Rubén Alarcón
Mauricio Aspe as Tobías Morán
Benjamín Rivero as El Ratón
Víctor Noriega as Paulo Sacristan
Harry Geithner as Everardo Castillo
Miguel Córcega as Father Manuel Robles
José Ángel García as Rodolfo Moreno
Blanca Torres as Enriqueta
Aurora Alonso as Prudencia
Freddy Ortega as Caco
Germán Ortega as Queeco
Jaime Lozano as Dr. Edgardo Ramos
Humberto Elizondo as Dr. Ortega
Aldo Monti as Lorenzo Ponti
Manuel "Loco" Valdés as Rigoberto "Rigo" Alarcón
Juan Carlos Casasola as El Catrín
Violeta Isfel as Paz
Tatiana Martínez as Lucía 
Patricia Romero as Lucha
Pablo Montero as Ánimas "Alma Caritativa"
Ernesto Alonso as Abad
Arturo Peniche as Fabio Sacristan
Marcial Casale as Trinidad
Armando Palomo as Libertad
Susana Lozano as Goya
Claudia Cervantes as Elena
Irma Torres as Mirta
Rodolfo Reyes as Teodoro
Vicente Torres as Adrián
Alberto Díaz as Arturo
Norma Reyna as Luz
Manuel Benítez as Iván
Roberto Meza as Ismael
Fernando Nesme as Oscar
Andrés Garza as Fernando "Fernandito" Villarreal Díaz Valencia
Alejandro Hernández as Juan Manuel Villarreal Valencia
Omar Ayala as El Tractor
Jessica Jurado as Martha del Castillo
Aleida Núñez as India
Gerardo Gallardo as Monje
Julio Escalero as Monje
Jacqueline Bracamontes as Leonela Montenegro de Valencia
Jorge Luis Pascual as Young Rogelio Valencia
Héctor Cruz as Young Father Manuel Robles
Oscar Traven as Nicolás Villarreal

Awards and nominations

DVD release
The telenovela was released on DVD in region one on 7 March 2006 with optional English subtitles. The 124-episode series was abridged to a run time of 550 minutes.

In popular culture
Entre el Amor y el Odio was the subject of a parody on the Mexican television program XHDRbZ which was called Entre el amor y Elodio. Susana González, Eugenio Derbez and Sammy appeared in the sketch as Elodio. 

In television series Los simuladores, pictures of telenovela are shown.

See also 
List of Entre el Amor y el Odio characters
List of programs broadcast by Televisa networks

References

External links

2002 telenovelas
Mexican telenovelas
2002 Mexican television series debuts
2002 Mexican television series endings
Spanish-language telenovelas
Television shows set in Mexico
Televisa telenovelas